Xibeiwang Station is a station on the Line 16 of the Beijing Subway. It opened in December 2016.

Station layout 
The station has an underground island platform.

Exits 
There are 3 exits, lettered A, B, and C. Exit B is accessible.

Transport connections

Rail
Schedule as of January 2021:

References

External links 

Xibeiwang Station - Beijing MTR Corporation Limited

Beijing Subway stations in Haidian District
Railway stations in China opened in 2016